Plisetsky, Plisetskaya (Russian: Плисецкий, Плисе́цкая) - surname.

 Michael Plisetsky was Consul General of the USSR at the island of Spitsbergen,  father of the Maya Plisetskaya, Aleksander Plisetsky.
 Maya Plisetskaya was a Russian ballet dancer, choreographer, ballet director.
 Aleksander Plisetsky was a Russian ballet dancer, ballet master, ballet director, brother of the Maya Plisetskaya.
 Anna Plisetskaya is a Russian ballerina, actress and producer, daughter  of the Aleksander Plisetsky.
 German Plisetsky was a notable Russian poet and translator.
 Yuri Plisetsky is a figure skating prodigy from the Japanese anime series Yuri!!! on Ice.

See also
 Plesetsk
 Plesetsk Cosmodrome
 4626 Plisetskaya is a main-belt asteroid discovered on December 23, 1984 by L. G. Karachkina at Nauchnyj.